Tuscaloosa tornado may refer to:

1997 Tuscaloosa tornado
December 2000 Tuscaloosa tornado
2011 Tuscaloosa–Birmingham tornado